Intra Airways Limited was a private, British independent airline formed in 1969. Initially, it was a charter airline operating passenger and cargo charters from the Channel Islands to the United Kingdom and Continental Europe. Scheduled services commenced in 1971, linking Jersey with Staverton. The airline also established an associated engineering company at Exeter Airport. In 1979, Intra Airways merged with Express Air Freight (C.I.) to form Jersey European Airways. The new entity was initially absorbed into Air Bridge Carriers (ABC), a Field Aviation/Hunting Group company. It subsequently left the Field Aviation/Hunting Group as a result of the demerger of Express Air Services, which had acquired Express Air Freight's cargo operation.

History

Intra Airways Ltd was formed on 1 January 1969 by former British United (C.I.) Airways employees to operate passenger and cargo charters from the Channel Islands to the UK and the Continent with a single Douglas DC-3. At the time of its inception, Intra Airways also applied to the Air Transport Licensing Board (ATLB) for a licence to commence scheduled services between Jersey and Guernsey.

Intra Holdings Ltd of Jersey was the newly formed airline's majority shareholder. It held 90% of Intra Airways's stock.

To support its fledgling operation, Intra Airways set up an associated engineering company based at Exeter Airport.

The ATLB granted Intra Airways its first licence to operate scheduled services at the beginning of 1971. That licence was for the Jersey—Staverton route. It resulted in the acquisition of a second DC-3.

In 1974, the Civil Aviation Authority (CAA), the ATLB's successor, approved Intra Airways's application for a scheduled service licence to operate 30 weekly flights between Shoreham Airport and Jersey and/or Guernsey, with an extension to Gatwick. However, the CAA's licence was for passenger services only. (It had rejected Intra Airways's proposal to serve these routes with DC-3s to carry both passengers and cargo.) Intra Airways planned to serve these routes with Islanders. The new services were intended to replace the Shoreham — Channel Islands services previously operated by JF Airlines, while the extension to Gatwick was meant to connect with Intra Airways's Gatwick—Deauville service.

By 1978, Intra Airways operated scheduled passenger services linking Jersey with Cambridge and Gloucester/Cheltenham (Staverton) in the UK as well as Caen, Deauville, Dinard, St Brieuc and Nantes in France, Ostend and Brussels in Belgium, and Düsseldorf in West Germany. In addition, it operated scheduled all-cargo services between Jersey and Guernsey as well as between the Channel Islands and Bournemouth (Hurn). The inter-Channel Islands cargo flights linked up with the domestic and international passenger service network.

In addition to expanding its scheduled operations, Intra Airways continued operating both ad hoc and regular series of charter flights until the end of its existence in the late 1970s. The latter included regular cargo flights carrying newspapers from Luton to Belfast Aldergrove operated with DC-3s at night and summer inclusive tour passenger charters from Gatwick to Dublin using Viscounts during daytime.

In January 1979 Intra Holdings Ltd sold its holding in Intra Airways. This resulted in the airline's merger with Bournemouth-based Express Air Freight (C.I.) Ltd. The new entity resulting from this merger was named Jersey European Airways (JEA). It was absorbed into East Midlands-based ABC, an all-cargo airline that was part of the Field Aviation/Hunting group of companies. (JEA began trading on 1 November 1979. Express Air Services, which took over the operation of Express Air Freight's cargo aircraft, subsequently demerged from JEA.).
Jersey European Airways later became Flybe. Due to the impact of COVID-19, Flybe ceased operations on 5 March 2020.
The Flybe name resumed operations in April 2022 under a new legal entity, though with largely the same brand and business model.

Fleet 
Intra Airways operated the following aircraft types:

Douglas DC-3 / C-47 Skytrain
Vickers Viscount 800

Fleet in 1969
In April 1969, the fleet of Intra Airways comprised 2 aircraft.

Intra Airways employed 8 people at this time.

Fleet in 1978
In April 1978, the fleet of Intra Airways comprised ten aircraft.

Intra Airways employed 130 people at this time.

Accidents and incidents
There are no recorded accidents or incidents involving aircraft owned and/or operated by Intra Airways.

See also
 List of defunct airlines of the United Kingdom

Notes
Notes

Citations

References
 (various backdated issues relating to Intra Airways, 1969–1979)

External links

 Air Times — Collector's Guide to Airline Timetables, Intra Airways
 Intra Airways Vickers Viscount 815 G-AVJB coming in to land at Düsseldorf Lohausen on 31 August 1979
 Intra Airways Douglas C-47B Dakota Mark 4 G-AMYJ taxiing at Staverton on 12 April 1978

Defunct airlines of Jersey
Airlines established in 1969
Airlines disestablished in 1979
British companies established in 1969
British companies disestablished in 1979